Wettenberg is a municipality in the district of Gießen, in Hessen, Germany.

References

Giessen (district)